Bilateral relations exist between Armenia and Serbia. Diplomatic relations between Armenia and the Federal Republic of Yugoslavia were established on 14 January 1993; Serbia is the legal successor to this country. Both countries are represented through their embassies in Athens, Greece, and both have established honorary consulates, which serve as the only diplomatic representatives between the two countries.

Armenia has a dispute with Azerbaijan over the Nagorno-Karabakh Republic, in which Serbia supports finding a peaceful political solution through supporting the OSCE Minsk Group and its work. Serbia has a dispute with Kosovo over its recognition as a sovereign state, where Armenia's asserted position has been not to recognize Kosovo's independence. Both countries are members of the United Nations, Council of Europe, Organization for Security and Co-operation in Europe, NATO's Partnership for Peace, the International Monetary Fund, and the International Bank for Reconstruction and Development.

History 

Saint Sava, a member of the medieval Nemanjić dynasty and founder of the Serbian Orthodox Church, visited a number of Armenian monasteries in the early 13th century. There, he met with Armenian clergy and asked them to pray for certain Serbs whom he mentioned by name. Serbian writer Miloš Crnjanski wrote that Sava was impressed with the mastery of local builders and invited them to build churches in Serbia.

One of the earliest traces of Armenians in Serbia can be found at a monastery in the village of Vitovnica, near Petrovac. The monastery contains a marble slab with a bilingual inscription carved in both Church Slavonic and Armenian; the inscription dates back to 1218 C.E. It was written by an Armenian—Ladon, Son of Babug—who built a church that was probably located in the nearby village of Ranovac. According to legend, Armenian warriors in the service of the Ottoman Empire constructed the Jermenčić monastery (lit. "Little Armenian" monastery) near Sokobanja shortly after the Battle of Kosovo in June 1389. It is said that they defected to the Serbs after discovering that they would be fighting their fellow Christians, fought against the Ottomans, retreated to the mountains around Sokobanja after the Serb defeat and built their monastery there. The monastery was razed several times by the Ottomans. Saint Gregory the Illuminator, the first official head of the Armenian Apostolic Church, was depicted in churches of medieval Serbia, and he is still venerated by the Serbian Orthodox Church.

The earliest works of 19th-century Serbian language reformer Vuk Stefanović Karadžić were published in Vienna by a printing house of Armenian Mechitarists. The Mechitarists also published the works of other Serb authors. In total, they printed 37 books and brochures, including The Mountain Wreath by Montenegrin Prince-Bishop Petar II Petrović-Njegoš. The monument was erected in 1993, and it commemorates the Serbian pilots who perished in a plane crash in 1988 while transporting humanitarian aid to Armenia after the country was struck by a catastrophic earthquake.

A colony of Armenian immigrants in Serbia existed in the 17th century. There is also the Armenian cemetery and the old fortress of Kalemegdan at the Danube river, which once was a border between the Austria-Hungary and the Ottoman Empire. After the Ottomans conquered Belgrade, they destroyed the city's Armenian and Jewish cemeteries. Today, only one Armenian tombstone remains, along with an inscription in Serbian which mentions the existence of an Armenian cemetery until the 17th century. A 1709 census shows that Armenians from Belgrade were wealthy and enjoyed a good standing in their community.

Another colony of Armenian immigrants was formed in the 20th century during and after the Armenian genocide. The persecuted Armenians settled in towns such as Belgrade, Vrnjačka Banja, Kruševac, Mladenovac, Zaječar, Negotin, Knjaževac, and Aleksinac. The number of Armenians that arrived in Serbia during this period remains unknown. In the mid-1930s, Armenians in Belgrade founded the Alliance of Armenians of Yugoslavia and established their headquarters in a building that came to be known as the Armenian House, which was razed at the end of the 1990s. The third wave of Armenian immigrants arrived in the early 1990s. Nearly all of these were wives of Serbs who had come to Armenia looking for work after the 1988 earthquake. According to publicist and diplomat Babken Simonyan, there were around 200 Armenians living in Serbia in 2010, three-quarters of whom lived in Belgrade. A significant Armenian population can be found in Vrnjačka Banja and Novi Sad. The city of Valjevo also has a small Armenian population. Most of Valjevo's Armenians immigrated to Serbia from the Kemah region, seeking employment. The community affairs of Valjevo's Armenians are run through the Armenka organization.

Armenian genocide
Since both Serbs and Armenians are commonly Christians, the genocide is widely known among Serbs. The genocide is studied and there has been a number of proposals over the genocide. However, Serbian Government has yet to recognize, due to dependence on investments from Turkey to develop the country and has rejected a bill to recognize it, owning a pragmatic approach.

While Serbia is yet to recognize the Armenian genocide, many members of Serbian Government paid tribute to victims of Armenian genocide. Serbian President Tomislav Nikolić has urged to recognize the genocide. Recognition of Armenian genocide, unofficially, is often referred with a sense of exotic brotherhood, which Serbs consider Armenians as their brothers and sisters in one similar cause.

Representation 

Diplomatic relations between Armenia and Serbia were established on 14 January 1993. Neither country has a resident ambassador. In 2014, Armenia's Foreign Minister Eduard Nalbandyan and Serbia's Foreign Minister Ivica Dačić announced that Serbia would open an embassy in Yerevan. The Armenian and Serbian embassies in Athens, Greece are responsible for relations between the two countries. Armenia's embassy is headed by Gagik Ghalachian, who presented his credentials to Serbia's President Boris Tadić on 17 February 2011, while Serbia's embassy is headed by Dragan Županjevac who presented his credentials to Armenia's President Serzh Sargsyan on 27 July 2009. On 25 January 2007, Serbia named Babken Simonyan its honorary consul to Armenia, while Armenia named Predrag Tomić its honorary consul in Serbia.

Agreements

Six agreements of mutual cooperation had been signed between the countries.

Trade and economic cooperation 

Armenia's membership in the Eurasian Customs Union (ECU) enabled free trade between Armenia and Serbia, as Serbia has made such agreement with the ECU. Even before Armenia's joining the ECU, Armenia's economy minister Vahram Avanesyan announced a possibility to sign such agreement with Serbia in March 2014.

Armenia's export to Serbia includes scrap metals and mechanical equipment, while Serbia's export to Armenia includes food. Trade turnover between the countries grew four times in 2013 compared to 2012, to $8.2 million. In 2013, Armenia's main exporting articles were mining materials, copper, clothing, used furniture and parts thereof, while Serbia's main exporting articles were medicine, machinery, agricultural harvesting, pressing, tights and socks. Serbia's Foreign Minister Ivan Mrkić said in March 2014 that agriculture, water management, chemical, petrochemical and pharmaceutical industries, as well as tourism, were the sectors that offered best prospects for cooperation. The trade exchange between Armenia and Serbia remains small, while both countries have promised to expand their mutual trade.

The first Armenian-Serbian Business Forum was held in Yerevan in March 2014, which was opened during the visit of Serbia's Foreign Minister Ivan Mrkić.

Visa regime 

In October 2014, Armenian Foreign Minister Eduard Nalbandyan and Serbian Foreign Minister Ivica Dačić announced an initiative to abolish visas for all citizens of Armenia and Serbia. In February 2015, the Government of Armenia upheld the signing of an agreement with Serbia to abolish entry visa requirements for individual with non-diplomatic passports. Armenia's government justified its decision by saying that "after the signing of the visa regime facilitation agreement with the European Union, the abolition of visa requirements between Armenia and Serbia may become an additional impetus for development of relations between the two countries." The government said that "the agreement is aimed at strengthening economic, humanitarian and cultural ties between the two countries and also at developing tourism".

Armenia's position on Kosovo 

The question of Kosovo's sovereignty is one of the most important political issues in Serbia. Armenia does not recognise Kosovo as an independent country, but its views on the dispute have largely been influenced by its interest in securing the independence of the Nagorno-Karabakh Republic from neighbouring Azerbaijan. While Baku stresses that the Nagorno-Karabakh is part of Azerbaijan, Armenia holds that the largely Armenian region should be independent in line with the principles of self-determination.

Former National Security Minister and chief Karabakh negotiator David Shahnazarian argued that even if Kosovo achieved its independence, it would not set a precedent for Nagorno-Karabakh because Armenia isn't democratic. He criticised the policy of the Western countries for "bypassing the norms they defended for 50 years", and said that Armenia's only possibility is nothing but to take this into account when formulating foreign policy. Armenia's former president, Serzh Sargsyan, has expressed that Armenia can not recognise Kosovo as long as it does not recognise the independence of the Republic of Artsakh, and that this is the only reason why Armenia would not recognise Kosovo's independence. In March 2008, Sargsyan said that Armenia had always supported a people's right to self-determination and stated that Armenia welcomed Kosovo's independence. He called for serious discussions regarding Kosovo and said that Armenia's recognition of Kosovo wouldn't harm the relations between Armenia and Russia.

In September 2010, Kosovo's Foreign Minister Skënder Hyseni met with Nalbandyan in New York City and asked for Armenia's recognition of Kosovo. At the meeting, Nalbandyan said that the principle of self-determination must not be subordinated to any other principle. He failed to announce Armenia's recognition for Kosovo, and only said that Armenia would maintain "useful" connections. The Armenian leadership has encountered great domestic opposition regarding their views on Kosovo. The largely pro-Serb Armenian population fears that by recognizing Kosovo, Armenia would be putting its strategic partnership with Russia at stake. During his visit to Serbia in 2011, Sargsyan said that Armenia would not change its attitude towards Kosovo and that it would never make any decision regarding Kosovo that was contrary to the interests of Serbia. In 2014, Nalbandyan stated that Armenia supports talks between Serbia and Kosovo so that a mutually acceptable solution could be found.

Serbia's position on Nagorno-Karabakh 

In March 2008, Serbia was among the countries that voted in favour of Resolution 62/243 at the United Nations General Assembly. The resolution dealt with the status of Nagorno-Karabakh, reaffirmed "continued respect and support for the sovereignty and territorial integrity of Azerbaijan within its internationally recognized borders", demanded the "immediate, complete and unconditional withdrawal of all Armenian forces from all the occupied territories [of Azerbaijan]" and emphasized that "no state shall render aid or assistance" to maintain the occupation of Azerbaijani territories.

During a visit to Baku, then-president Tadić said that Serbia supports Azerbaijan's territorial integrity and its position on the resolution of the Nagorno-Karabakh conflict. In October 2014, Dačić told Nalbandyan that Serbia would support the OSCE Minsk Group and its work in order to "preserve peace and bring a political solution to the problem". On a visit to Baku two months later, Dačić stated that Serbia insists both on the peaceful resolution of the conflict and on the withdrawal of Armenian armed forces from Nagorno-Karabakh. For both, Armenia and Azerbaijan, the position of Serbia on the Nagorno-Karabakh issue is important as on 1 January 2015 Serbia assumed the chairmanship of the OSCE, which guides negotiations on Karabakh via the Minsk Group process. In an interview from October 2014, Serbian President Tomislav Nikolić said that during its chairmanship over the OSCE, Serbia will insist on Madrid principles and support efforts of the Minsk Group "with full respect for international law and territorial integrity".

High level visits

See also 
 Foreign relations of Armenia
 Foreign relations of Serbia
 Armenians in Serbia

Notes

References
Books

 
 

Journals

 

News reports

 
 
 
 
 
 
 
 
 
 
 
 
 
 
 
 
 
 
 
 
 
 
 
 
 
 

Other sources

 
 
 
 

 
Serbia
Armenia